Karl Etlinger (16 October 1879 – 8 May 1946) was a German film actor. He appeared in more than 110 films between 1914 and 1946.

Selected filmography

 The Eternal Curse (1921)
 The Poisoned Stream (1921)
 The Films of Princess Fantoche (1921)
 Lumpaci the Vagabond (1922)
 Nosferatu (1922)
 What Belongs to Darkness (1922)
 The Lodging House for Gentleman (1922)
 Phantom (1922)
 Countess Donelli (1924)
 Debit and Credit (1924)
 The Man at Midnight (1924)
 Zigano (1925)
 The Girl with a Patron (1925)
 We'll Meet Again in the Heimat (1926)
 One Does Not Play with Love (1926)
 Fadette (1926)
 Young Blood (1926)
 Bigamie (1927)
 That Was Heidelberg on Summer Nights (1927)
 The Bordellos of Algiers (1927)
 Family Gathering in the House of Prellstein (1927)
 Katharina Knie (1929)
 Napoleon at Saint Helena (1929)
 The Woman One Longs For (1929)
 Waltz of Love (1930)
 Two Hearts in Waltz Time (1930)
 Scandalous Eva (1930)
 End of the Rainbow (1930)
 The King of Paris (1930)
 Men Behind Bars (1931)
 Bombs on Monte Carlo (1931)
 The Mask Falls (1931)
 Die Fledermaus (1931)
 Kismet (1931)
 The Concert (1931)
 A Night at the Grand Hotel (1931)
 The Ringer (1932)
 The Countess of Monte Cristo (1932)
 Madame Makes Her Exit (1932)
 Love at First Sight (1932)
 The Golden Anchor (1932)
 Melody of Love (1932)
 Variety (1935)
 The Dreamer (1936)
 Savoy Hotel 217 (1936)
 The Glass Ball (1937)
 Maria Ilona (1939)
 Mistake of the Heart (1939)
 My Aunt, Your Aunt (1939)
 Falstaff in Vienna (1940)
 Passion (1940)
 Happiness is the Main Thing (1941)
 The Great Love (1942)
 Gabriele Dambrone (1943)
 A Man With Principles? (1943)
 Back Then (1943)
 Romance in a Minor Key (1943)
 The Eternal Tone (1943)
 The Enchanted Day (1944)
 Tell the Truth (1946)
 An Everyday Story (1948)
 The Court Concert (1948)

References

External links

1879 births
1946 deaths
German male film actors
German male silent film actors
20th-century German male actors
Male actors from Vienna